The Hadley Group is a privately owned British company, founded in 1964 by Philip Hadley, which is a large producer of cold rolled steel sections and allied products.

Company 
The Hadley Group headquarters is in Smethwick. The company also has bases in the United Kingdom, Thailand, Dubai, and Netherlands and conducts business in 36 countries covering 5 continents.  In 2018, the company employs more than 600 people worldwide.

Awards and recognitions 
The company was awarded the Queen's Award for Enterprise: Innovation in 2014.

References

External links
Official Website
Official EU Website

Manufacturing companies of the United Kingdom